Orašje is a village in the municipality of Jegunovce, North Macedonia. It used to be part of the former municipality of Vratnica.

Demographics
According to the 2021 census, the village had a total of 625 inhabitants. Ethnic groups in the village include:

Albanians 569
Persons for whom data are taken from administrative sources 56

References

Villages in Jegunovce Municipality
Albanian communities in North Macedonia